Deanville may refer to:

Deanville, Texas, an unincorporated community in Burleson County
Deanville, West Virginia, an unincorporated community in Upshur County